Miles Edgeworth, known as  in original Japanese language versions, is a fictional prosecutor in Ace Attorney, a visual novel adventure video game series created by Japanese company Capcom. Initially introduced as a cold-hearted perfectionist, he appears as the antagonistic rival to main character Phoenix Wright in Phoenix Wright: Ace Attorney (2001). Following the events of the first game, the character has a change of heart and reappears as a friendly rival in a minor capacity in most of the subsequent titles in the series.

Due to the character's popularity, universally positive critical reception, and status as a breakout character, Edgeworth went on to star in two of his own spin-off games, Ace Attorney Investigations: Miles Edgeworth (2009) and its sequel. Edgeworth has also made appearances in extended Ace Attorney media, such as film and animation, as well as several cameo appearances in titles outside of the main Ace Attorney series.

Design
According to Shu Takumi, Edgeworth was difficult to develop as a character compared to Wright. Edgeworth's character came together once Takumi decided he would be rich. In the original game, Takumi designed Edgeworth to be an unlikable and tragic character. This is seen in Manfred von Karma raising Edgeworth to be a prosecutor and then prosecuting him for murder, just to have his revenge against Edgeworth's father. After the first game, when Takumi saw a comic depicting Edgeworth liking the Steel Samurai, he decided that a more likable Edgeworth would be "cuter", and so Edgeworth was fleshed out into the valuable friend and ally seen since Farewell, My Turnabout.

In Edgeworth's original design, he was going to be a 36-year-old veteran prosecutor, but the staff decided that was not interesting enough as a rival. When Shu Takumi saw the second version of the character, he was struck with inspiration and created the backstory between him and Wright. The design team added the iconic cravat to make a distinct silhouette but did not finalize that addition until von Karma's design was. The older Edgeworth in Dual Destinies went through many iterations. In the first design, he had large frills that went down to his thighs. In other designs, he had grown facial hair. In the end, Edgeworth retained an "elegant" look, with rolled-back sleeves and vest, and sporting a longer coat and a pair of glasses, appearing more like his father.

Appearances
Edgeworth's first appearance was in Phoenix Wright: Ace Attorney, where he is introduced as an antagonist prosecutor with a perfect record, who would do anything to win a trial; he is presented as respectable, but cold and ruthless. Throughout the game, the perception of Edgeworth changes, starting in episode three when he, for reasons then unknown, suddenly helps Wright to corner a witness. In the next episode, Edgeworth finds himself accused of murder, and Wright defends him against Manfred von Karma, Edgeworth's austere adoptive father and mentor, who won every case in his 40-year career. It is revealed during this episode that Wright and Edgeworth, along with Larry Butz, were childhood friends, and that Manfred von Karma murdered Miles's father, the defense attorney Gregory Edgeworth, and raised Miles as a prosecutor under his wing. Edgeworth believed he himself shot his father, a fact that led to him becoming a prosecutor instead of a defense attorney.

After his father's murder is resolved, Edgeworth becomes much more relaxed about his strict rules and personality, and becomes less antagonistic. It is also revealed that many rumors and negativity exist about him in the legal field. In "Rise from the Ashes", a fifth episode included in all subsequent editions of Phoenix Wright: Ace Attorney after the original GBA version, he is portrayed as reaching solely for the truth; however, guilt-ridden by his reputation and past as a prosecutor, he disappears and leaves a supposed suicide note stating "Prosecutor Edgeworth chooses death."

Edgeworth returns in Phoenix Wright: Ace Attorney – Justice for All, where it is revealed that he is alive, and his purpose for running away was so that he could think about what it really means to be a prosecutor. As a result of this, he has become less focused on guilty verdicts in favor of seeking the truth. He acts as the prosecutor for the final episode when Franziska von Karma is incapacitated, and helps Wright take down the villain. Later, he meets with Franziska to discuss his reasons for choosing the path he has, and advising her to also consider similar personal growth.

In Phoenix Wright: Ace Attorney – Trials and Tribulations Edgeworth has left the country to study abroad for a time, and is called back by Larry Butz to assist Phoenix, who fell from a burning bridge into a river and is in the hospital. Edgeworth temporarily stands in as the acting defense attorney for Phoenix's client, while Franziska acts as prosecutor. Later, he and Franziska assist Phoenix in the rescue of Phoenix's assistant Maya Fey. During the game's events, Phoenix looks into Mia Fey's first case as a defense attorney, in which Edgeworth went up against her in court, which set many of the game's events into motion.

Edgeworth gained a starring role in the spin-off Ace Attorney Investigations: Miles Edgeworth, in which he investigates murders relating to a smuggling ring. During the course of the game, he meets Kay Faraday, a young self-proclaimed "great thief", who acts as his assistant in a similar vein to Maya. A flashback case focuses on a younger Edgeworth investigating a case early in his career, explaining how he and Detective Dick Gumshoe first met.

In Ace Attorney Investigations 2 — again in the starring role  — Edgeworth comes under fire by the Prosecutorial Investigation Committee, who seek to have him stripped of his badge. Edgeworth begins investigating cases tied to a larger conspiracy and cover-up, including the last case his father took before his murder, and struggles between his life path of becoming a defense attorney like his father, or continuing as a prosecuting attorney.

While Edgeworth does not appear in person in Apollo Justice: Ace Attorney, in later games he is mentioned as still being in contact with Wright after he lost his attorney's badge, as well as seeing his daughter Trucy's magic shows from time to time.

Edgeworth returns as a friendly rival in Phoenix Wright: Ace Attorney – Dual Destinies. Set eight years after Trials and Tribulations, Edgeworth has since become the district chief prosecutor. He assists Phoenix in unraveling the mystery of the spy known as the "Phantom", stepping in as the prosecutor for the first half of Simon Blackquill's retrial. When they successfully clear Blackquill of all charges, Edgeworth declares Blackquill a free man, unlocks his shackles for good, and assigns him to the second half of the trial while he goes to investigate the case further. In the end, Edgeworth proves to the court that the detective known as "Bobby Fulbright" is actually an impostor, allowing both the defense and prosecution to expose him as the "Phantom". At the conclusion of the trial, Edgeworth joins the team to celebrate, reveals he was the one who pushed for the Bar Association to restore Phoenix's badge, and later sees the launch of the HAT-3 shuttle from the comfort of his office window.

Edgeworth returns once again in Phoenix Wright: Ace Attorney – Spirit of Justice. Here, he assists Phoenix in resolving a hostage situation in Khura'in involving Maya Fey, as well as the true ownership of a valuable Khura'inese treasure. In the game's special case, he takes up the prosecutor's bench during a murder trial, where the defendant claims to have traveled through time. During the course of the special case, Edgeworth mentions to Phoenix that he has purged all corrupt prosecutors from the department and is unfortunately short-handed, having retained only a handful of prosecutors that he implicitly trusts, like Klavier Gavin and Simon Blackquill.

Other appearances

Cameos
Edgeworth makes a brief cameo at the end of the Ace Attorney crossover title, Professor Layton vs. Phoenix Wright: Ace Attorney, where he is seen taking on Wright in a trial. He also makes an appearance in one of the game's DLC episodes. Outside of the Ace Attorney series, Edgeworth makes a cameo appearance in She-Hulk's Marvel vs. Capcom 3: Fate of Two Worlds ending, and appears as a "Heroes & Heralds" card in the game's update, Ultimate Marvel vs. Capcom 3. Edgeworth appears as a card in the game SNK vs. Capcom: Card Fighters DS, and as a non-playable character in Project X Zone 2.

Adaptations
Edgeworth has appeared in other media adaptations of Ace Attorney. In the Japanese Ace Attorney stage musical Ace Attorney – Truth Resurrected, staged by the all-female troupe Takarazuka Revue, Asahi Miwa portrays Leona Clyde, an original composite character based on Edgeworth and Lana Skye, depicted as Phoenix Wright's love interest, who defended him in his childhood class trial as a young girl in place of Edgeworth. While Edgeworth is also present in the musical and its sequel Ace Attorney 2 – Truth Resurrected, Again (in which Leona is established to have died) as a separate minor character, respectively portrayed in each by Hikaru Nanaho and Hiro Yūmi, he is merely a rival to Wright with no personal connection to him.

Takumi Saito portrays Edgeworth in the 2012 live-action film Ace Attorney, loosely adapting his role in the first game; Roi Hayashi plays Edgeworth as a child. Edgeworth appears in the 2016 Ace Attorney anime series, which adapts the events of the first three games in the series; he is voiced by Masashi Tamaki in Japanese and Christopher Wehkamp in English. Edgeworth also appears as a recurring character in the Phoenix Wright: Ace Attorney manga series, as well as the main character of its spinoff series, Ace Attorney Investigations: Miles Edgeworth.

Reception
In 2009, GamesRadar hailed Miles Edgeworth as one of the best video game characters of the decade. The staff of the Adventure Gamers not only named him the best character of 2010 but also "one of the most intriguing characters ever to grace an adventure game". PC Gamer also praised Edgeworth's characterization and character arc for communicating "a simple yet powerful message—before you can show justice to other people, you have to experience justice yourself".

While reviewing Ace Attorney Investigations: Miles Edgeworth, Touch Arcade lauded how "his collected personality [in the game] provides a fun contrast to the usual hapless protagonists found in this franchise."; Reviewing its sequel, Noisy Pixel praised the game for "hon[ing] in on Edgeworth as a character, making me appreciate him and his circumstances far more than any previous game [in the Ace Attorney series] did", describing him as a "fan-favorite", with The Daily Trojan likewise complimenting "Edgeworth’s take on morally ambiguous shortcuts" over the course of the narrative, with the "morally gray setting within the game challeng[ing] Edgeworth" straight "through [to] his steady [character] development".

The San Francisco Chronicle praised the "dadification" Miles Edgeworth through his "history and closeness" with Trucy Wright (the daughter of Edgeworth's rival Phoenix) and his role as "a significant adult" in her life. In particular, it took a moment when Trucy sleeps on Edgeworth's shoulder in Spirit of Justice and compared him to "any dad who desperately wants to move, but won't disrupt his child's all-important rest". The piece concluded by expressing interest in future Ace Attorney media acknowledging Edgeworth in a queer-platonic or romantic same-sex relationship.

Anime News Network praised Edgeworth's role in the 2016 Ace Attorney anime series' seventh episode, an expansion of the character's backstory.

References

Ace Attorney characters
Capcom antagonists
Capcom protagonists
Male characters in video games
Fictional American people in video games
Fictional characters from Los Angeles
Fictional prosecutors
Video game characters introduced in 2001
Orphan characters in video games
Fictional characters with post-traumatic stress disorder